Emery is an American post-hardcore band formed in Rock Hill, South Carolina, in 2001 by Toby Morrell, Devin Shelton, Matt Carter, Josh Head, Joel Green, and Seth Studley. The band relocated to Seattle in order to reach a more music-centered scene.

Before signing with Tooth & Nail Records, Emery recorded two EPs, The Columbus EEP Thee and The Weak's End demo that they used to attract attention from labels. With Tooth & Nail, they recorded five studio albums and two EPs. The Weak's End, their debut album, was released in 2004, followed by The Question in 2005 and I'm Only a Man in 2007. The latter fulfilled Emery's contract with Tooth & Nail. However, the band re-signed with the label and released ...In Shallow Seas We Sail on June 2, 2009, and We Do What We Want on March 29, 2011. After signing with BadChristian Music, the band released You Were Never Alone on May 19, 2015, and Eve on November 9, 2018.

History

Early years (2000–2010) 

Emery formed in 2001 in Rock Hill, South Carolina, but moved to Seattle, Washington, in search of a better musical environment. The band was named after a first grader that Toby Morrell met while working as an intern for a teacher in college. The four members in the band at the time, Toby Morrell (vocals/guitar), Devin Shelton (drums), Matt Carter (guitar/keyboards), and Joel "Chopper" Green (bass) left Rock Hill, South Carolina, for Seattle on September 11, the day of the terrorist attacks; they found out about the attacks when they stopped at a Cracker Barrel restaurant in North Carolina. Most of the members are from the bands Sachul, Joe 747, Simply Waynes and Oogie Brown. After a little while Seth Studley, who was one of the original members of the band, broke out of a serious relationship and followed them to Seattle and resumed his post as drummer. Because Seth took over drums, Devin took the position of guitarist.

After making Emerald City their new home in Seattle, Washington, Emery signed a record deal with Tooth & Nail Records, also of Seattle, in 2002. Wasting no time, Emery paired up with producer/engineer Ed Rose and worked on their debut album, The Weak's End. It was produced at the Black Lodge Studio in Eudora, Kansas. The record was released in January 2004 by Tooth & Nail Records. Emery toured extensively to promote their new release.

While touring, Seth Studley decided to leave the band in order to get married and Emery had to look for a new drummer. While touring with Haste the Day, Dave Powell was brought out to audition. Powell was officially put in the band in November 2005. Powell originally played in the Indianapolis-based metalcore/hardcore band The Bowels of Judas.

Soon after touring, Emery went back into the studio to record their next record with production done by Aaron Sprinkle this time around. The band took five weeks in recording sessions. The Question was released on August 2, 2005. "Studying Politics" was released as the album's first single with a video emerging on June 29, 2005. On November 21, 2006, Emery re-released The Question, adding a DVD, five acoustic versions of previously recorded songs and two new demo tracks, which were produced by Matt Carter. The DVD included a documentary film of Emery, live songs and bonus footage.

After the re-release, Joel "Chopper" Green decided to leave the band. On September 19, 2006, Emery posted a blog on their website explaining the departure. Devin and Toby have now switched bass parts in concerts and in the studio.

While touring with Underoath in Australia, Emery announced that they were releasing a new album, I'm Only a Man, which leaked onto the internet before its official release on October 2, 2007. It was produced by Ryan Boesch and Matt Carter and recorded at Dark Horse Recording Studio in Tennessee. It received mixed reviews. Emery released a deluxe edition of the album as well, which featured four acoustic songs that were recorded while on the Take Action Tour with The Red Jumpsuit Apparatus and DVD with live footage and a documentary. The iTunes version of the deluxe edition also added a bonus track called "Whoa! Man".

Emery announced in an interview on TVU that they finished a new 8-track EP entitled While Broken Hearts Prevail, which was released on October 28, 2008. They began premiering some of the new material while on tour opening for The Almost, including "Edge of the World".

In an interview with Toby Morrell, Emery announced that they would be releasing a new album called ...In Shallow Seas We Sail. Up until the announcement of Emery re-signing to Tooth & Nail Records, it was unsure if the band would seek a new label, since their contract had expired. They re-signed with Tooth & Nail and soon gave out information on their new release.

On April 7, 2009, Emery released a new song entitled "Cutthroat Collapse" on their Myspace, Purevolume, and iTunes. On May 29, 2009, Emery put ...In Shallow Seas We Sail in its entirety up on their Myspace. On June 2, 2009, ...In Shallow Seas We Sail was officially released. Emery also confirmed during a chat thread on AbsolutePunk that their first music video off of the new album was going to be "Cutthroat Collapse".

During their headlining U.S. tour, Emery had selected dates filmed for a DVD in the works. The release date is unknown at this time. Emery set out on tour supporting Underoath on their fall/winter headlining tour for the rest of the year. In the summer of 2010 they went on the "Scream it Like You Mean it" tour with Silverstein, Ivoryline, Dance Gavin Dance, We Came as Romans, Sky Eats Airplane, and I Set My Friends on Fire.

Recent activity (2011–present) 

On January 26, 2011, it was announced that the band's fifth album, We Do What We Want, was set to be released on March 29, 2011. The band also released a clip of a song titled "Scissors". Another song titled "Curse of Perfect Days" was released to Christian rock radio stations.

On January 31, 2011, vocalist, rhythm guitarist, and bassist Devin Shelton announced he was taking an "indefinite hiatus" from Emery.

On February 1, 2011, a song titled "The Cheval Glass" was released on the band's Facebook, YouTube and Myspace page. On February 17, 2011, the band announced that We Do What We Want would be released through both Tooth & Nail and their hardcore/metal subdivision Solid State Records reflecting the heavier sound of the album. "Lyrically I think this is our most personal, spiritual album. It talks about our faith and God, but it never gets too preachy, because it's basically talking about me and things I've gone through," shares Morrell. "I can't not tell the truth of who I am, and this time I explored that even further — just points in my life, or in the other guys' lives. Some lyrics are about challenging authority and God, and is God real, and what that even means. " 

Emery headlined the "Do What You Want" tour alongside the bands To Speak of Wolves, and Hawkboy (formerly As Cities Burn). While on tour, the band has announced that they would be coming out with an acoustic album. On March 28, 2011, Emery released a stream of their new album We Do What We Want on AOL.com.

On May 9, 2011, Emery released a music video for the song "The Cheval Glass". On August 9 they released a music video for the song "Scissors".

On October 18, 2011, Tooth & Nail released Ten Years, a compilation album gleaned from Emery's first four albums. In 2012, Matt Carter and Toby Morrell worked on the acoustic project titled Matt & Toby. As a result, a self-titled album was released on November 19, 2012, through Tooth & Nail Records. In the support of the album Matt & Toby toured a "Living Room Tour" in October–November 2012 and January–February 2013. During the shows they played songs from the album as well as Emery songs and some covers in acoustic.

In 2013, Emery left Tooth & Nail/Solid State Records and established their own label, BadChristian Music. In 2013-2014, Emery played a two-part The Weak's End 10th Anniversary tour where it was joined by Devin Shelton.

In March 2014, the band released a demo of two new songs. The album You Were Never Alone, funded via crowdfunding, was set to be released in mid-2014 but the release date was later pushed back. On April 28, 2015 the band released a music video for the song "Hard Times". You Were Never Alone was released on May 19, 2015, via BadChristian Music, and it appeared on several Billboard charts: No. 69 on the Billboard 200, No. 1 on Top Christian Albums, No. 6 on Independent Albums, No. 8 on Alternative Music No. 10 on Top Rock Albums and No. 31 on Top Album Sales.

In June 2015, guitarist Matt Carter began releasing his podcast Break It Down With Matt Carter. The first 12 episodes were a track-by-track breakdown of You Were Never Alone featuring interview with other band members, producers, and friends from other bands. In October 2015, Carter and Morrell released a two-part episode of the Break It Down podcast explaining how You Were Never Alone is a concept album, with each song as a different story from the Bible.

On December 14, 2015 the band released an eight-track EP, We Wish You Emery Christmas, as a free download.

On April 30, 2016, Emery released an Emery Acoustic: Live in Houston EP.

On March 17, 2017, Emery started a crowdfunding campaign for the next album with the $50,000 goal reached one day after the campaign start. Every backer was given an instant download of Emery: Classics Reimagined EP including re-done versions of "So Cold I Can See My Breath", "As Your Voice Fades", and "The Smile, The Face".

On November 17, 2017, Emery released Revival: Emery Classic Reimagined, an album containing all three tracks from Emery: Classics Reimagined EP plus seven more songs from the band's catalogue rearranged in acoustic.

On November 9, 2018 Emery released their seventh album: Eve.

On June 5, 2020 Emery released their eighth album: White Line Fever. The band has stated on social media that the album's themes are built heavily around the terrorist attacks of September 11, 2001, and where the band was during the occurrence of the events, as they'd just left their home town and departed for Seattle the day of.

In 2021, Emery released I'm Only a Man (Studio Update) — a new, rerecorded from scratch, remixed and remastered version of their 2007 album I'm Only A Man — and three live albums, The Weak's End (Live Version), The Question Live and I'm Only a Man (Live Version). On November 23, 2021, Emery released a live captured version of their upcoming studio album Rub Some Dirt on It.

Style 
While the band avoid the stigma of being labeled a "Christian band", the members are all Christian, exploring a wide variety of lyrical themes in their music.
The band sound varies between post-hardcore, melodic hardcore, emo, hard rock, alternative rock, and most recently metalcore.

BadChristian & Knuckle Breakers  
Toby Morrell, Matt Carter and their friend, pastor and former Emery bassist Joey Svendsen used to run a blog called Un-learning, where they wrote about moral and religious issues. The intent was usually to hold open discussions about sensitive topics, while getting a variety of different viewpoints (Christian, atheist, etc.) 

In 2013, Un-learning was rebooted as BadChristian. In addition to being a blog, BadChristian also serves as a podcast where the three host discussions with guests such as Underoath, Norma Jean, Thrice etc. BadChristian also serves as the band's own label titled BC Music. The label roster includes Emery, Matt & Toby, The Classic Crime, Vocal Few, Kings Kaleidoscope, Abandon Kansas, Pacific Gold, Zach Bolen (of Citizens & Saints) and House of Heroes.

In 2014, BadChristian published books "BadChristian, Great Savior" and "The M Word".

In 2015, BadChristian released the BadChristian app for iOS, Android, and Windows Phone. It provides free mobile access to the BC blog, podcasts and some of the BC Music artist music. Also, in 2015, BadChristian published a third ebook, BadChristian Tackles the Lighter Topics.

In 2021, BadChristian's YouTube channel containing all the material since 2013, was renamed to Knuckle Breakers. 

On November 24, 2021, Emery released a video version of their ninth studio album, Rub Some Dirt On It, via Knuckle Breakers YouTube Channel.

Side projects 

 Toby Morrell had a side project entitled I Am Waldo. The music was based on the book of Psalms and was mostly acoustic.
 Devin Shelton's side project was called Devinitely. Initially, his music was mostly R&B and made using GarageBand. After parting ways with Emery in 2011, Shelton decided to play solo under his own name and released a debut album, Life & Death, on January 22, 2013. It features 10 tracks, including an alternative version of "Crumbling", which was originally released as a bonus track for Emery's We Do What We Want (2011). Shelton released his follow-up album, Sensation, on January 6, 2017. It features 12 tracks.
 Dave Powell is in an indie rock band called Beyond Oceans with Jason Barnes and Brennan Chaulk (both formerly of Haste the Day). In early 2013, he agreed to play drums on the upcoming reunion/farewell album by Trenches, but later was replaced by original band drummer Zach Frizzell.
 Matt Carter and Toby Morrell joined forces to create a side project named Matt and Toby Band. They released one full length, self-titled album in October 2012 under this side project and were on various living room tours in the United States following its release. Matt and Toby have said they look to release more music under this band. In 2017, the project released I Quit Church.

Discography 

 The Weak's End (2004)
 The Question (2005)
 I'm Only a Man (2007)
 ...In Shallow Seas We Sail (2009)
 We Do What We Want (2011)
 You Were Never Alone (2015)
 Eve (2018)
 White Line Fever (2020)
 Rub Some Dirt On It (2022)

Members 

Current members
 Toby Morrell — lead vocals (2001–present), bass (2011–2013, 2015), rhythm guitar (2001, 2015–present)
 Devin Shelton — backing and co-lead vocals (2001–2011, 2013–2014, 2015–present), bass (2006-2011, 2013–2014, 2015–present), rhythm guitar (2001–2006), drums, percussion (2001)
 Josh Head — unclean vocals, keyboards, synthesizer, backing vocals (2001–present)
 Matt Carter — lead guitar, backing vocals (2001–present)
 Dave Powell — drums, percussion (2005–present)

Current touring musicians
 Chris Keene — rhythm guitar, bass (2017–present)

Former members
 Joey Svendsen — bass (2001)
 Joel "Chopper" Green — bass (2001–2006)
 Seth Studley — drums, percussion (2001–2004)

Former touring musicians
 Andy Nichols – bass, backing vocals (2011–2013, 2015), drums, percussion (2016)
 Matt MacDonald – bass, backing vocals (2015)
 Jeremy Spring – bass, backing vocals (2014)
 Dane Andersen – drums, percussion (2012)
 Andrew Nyte – drums, percussion (2013)

 Timeline

References

External links 

 
 Emery biography at Tooth & Nail Records
 
 Interview @ SHOUT! Music Webzine
 Emery interview at AbsolutePunk.net

Musical groups established in 2001
American post-hardcore musical groups
Tooth & Nail Records artists
Musical groups from Washington (state)
Christian alternative metal groups
Solid State Records artists